Garhmukteshwar Assembly constituency is one of the 403 constituencies of the Uttar Pradesh Legislative Assembly, India. It is a part of the Hapur district and one of the five assembly constituencies in the Amroha Lok Sabha constituency. First election in this assembly constituency was held in 1957 after the Delimitation of Parliamentary and Assembly Constituencies Order 1961 (DPACO) was passed. After DPACO 2008 was passed, the constituency was assigned identification number 60.

During the 3rd Vidhan Sabha, the constituency was reserved for candidates from  scheduled caste community.

In 2022, shri Harendra Singh Teotia of Bharatiya Janata Party won the seat by defeating Ravindra Chaudhary from Samajwadi Party with a margin of 26306 votes.
Garhmukteshwar Assembly constituency is falling under Amroha Lok sabha constituency.
Date of Polling: Thursday, 10 February 2022
Date of electoral Counting Result: Thursday, 10 March 2022

Members of the Legislative Assembly

Election Result

18th Vidhan Sabha: 2022 General Elections

17th Vidhan Sabha: 2017 General  Elections

16th Vidhan Sabha: 2012 General Elections

See also
Amroha Lok Sabha constituency
Ghaziabad district, India
Sixteenth Legislative Assembly of Uttar Pradesh
Uttar Pradesh Legislative Assembly

References 
 https://results.eci.gov.in/ResultAcGenMar2022/ConstituencywiseS2460.htm?ac=60

External links
 

Assembly constituencies of Uttar Pradesh
Hapur district